19 Corps, 19th Corps, XIX Corps, or XIX Army Corps may refer to:

 19th Army Corps (France)
 19th Army Corps (Russian Empire)
 XIX (2nd Royal Saxon) Corps, a unit of the Imperial German Army prior to and during World War I
 XIX Corps (Ottoman Empire) 
 XIX Corps (United Kingdom)
 XIX Corps (United States)
 XIX Corps (Union Army)
 XIX Army Corps of the Wehrmacht

See also
 19th Division (disambiguation)
 19th Brigade (disambiguation)
 19th Regiment (disambiguation)
 19th Group (disambiguation)
 19th Battalion (disambiguation)
 19th Squadron (disambiguation)